Pandemis curvipenita is a species of moth of the family Tortricidae. It is found in Jilin, China.

References

	

Moths described in 1982
Pandemis